Marquis Who's Who ( or ) is an American publisher of a number of directories containing short biographies. The books usually are entitled Who's Who in... followed by some subject, such as Who's Who in America, Who's Who of American Women, Who's Who in the World, Who's Who in Science and Engineering, Who's Who in American Politics, etc. Often, Marquis Who's Who books are found in the reference section of local libraries, at corporate libraries, and are also used for research by universities.

In 2005, while Marquis was owned by News Communications, Inc., publishers of The Hill; The New York Times referred to the sixtieth edition of Who's Who in America as "a librarian's Vanity Fair".

Marquis states in its preface that Who's Who in America "endeavors to profile the leaders of American society; those men and women who are influencing their nation's development".

Entries in Marquis Who's Who books list career and personal data for each biography, including birth date and place, names of parents and family members, education, writings and creative works, civic activities, awards, political affiliation, religion, and addresses. The content also is provided online to libraries and other paid subscribers.

History
Founded in 1898 by Albert Nelson Marquis as an American counterpoint to the UK-oriented publication of the same name (published by A.C. Black since 1849 and, notably, including substantial biographies since 1897), the first edition of the publication contained concise biographies of more than 8,500 "distinguished Americans". Albert Marquis wrote that the book's objective was to "chronicle the lives of individuals whose achievements and contributions to society make them subjects of widespread reference interest and inquiry."

Originally independent, it was acquired by the conglomerate ITT. Macmillan bought ITT's publishing division in 1985. Reed Publishing bought Marquis and National Register from Macmillan in 1991. Reed Elsevier sold Marquis and National Register to Commonwealth Business Media in 2001. News Communications, Inc., which owns The Hill, bought Marquis in 2003.

In 2016, the company's assets, including all the trademarks were transferred to Marquis Who's Who Ventures LLC, which is privately owned.

Publications

General publications
Marquis publications include:

Who's Who in America
Who's Who in the World
Who's Who in American Art
Who's Who in American Politics
Who's Who in the East
Who's Who in the West
Who's Who in the Midwest
Who's Who in the South / Southwest
Who's Who in Medicine and Healthcare
Who's Who in Asia
Who's Who in American Law
Who's Who in Corporate America
Who's Who in Science and Engineering
Who's Who of American Women

Historical series
Who Was Who in America )
Who's Who in 20th Century America

Selection process
Marquis Who's Who states that selection of individuals for listing in its publications "is based on reference value. Individuals become eligible for listing by virtue of their positions and/or noteworthy achievements that have proved to be of significant value to society. An individual's desire to be listed is not sufficient reason for inclusion. Similarly, wealth or social position are not criteria. Purchase of the book is never a factor in the selection of biographees".

A 2005 The New York Times feature describes some aspects of the selection process: "An editorial team of 70, including 12 researchers, make the call on who's notable and who's not".

Marquis calls its selection criteria "stringent" and claims that biographical data on candidates for listing are reviewed by its editors to confirm that its requirements are met. Their chief executive, Gene M. McGovern, told The New York Times that "the fundamental standards here are position and accomplishment". Once selected, a biographical draft is sent to biographees for pre-publication checking. In cases where notable individuals decline to submit biographical data, Marquis proceeds to compile all of the information to be published.

Criticism
In 2007, referring to the International Biographical Centre, the American Biographical Institute, and Marquis Who's Who, Jan Margosian, consumer information coordinator for the Oregon Department of Justice, lumped all biographical reference volumes together in a "warning to consumers" to be wary, labeled all such companies "pretty tacky", and added that "I don't know why they would put you in there if they weren't hoping to get you to buy the book. You truly have to look at how they are marketing and what the spin is. It's something you might want to watch out for".

In 1999, Forbes magazine published  "The Hall of Lame" by Tucker Carlson, in which Carlson reported that the selection process was neither rigorous nor meaningful; self-nominators and thousands of people who are not particularly notable were included; and that Marquis profited by selling subscriber addresses to direct mail marketers.

As reference source
Forbes adopted Who’s Who in America as a source for compiling information on post-graduate success when it began ranking America's most prestigious colleges in 2007. Forbes stopped referencing Marquis Who’s Who in 2013, replacing it with various of its own lists, such as Power Women, 30 Under 30, CEOs on the Global 2000, Nobel and Pulitzer prize winners, Guggenheim and MacArthur Fellows, those elected to the National Academy of Sciences, and winners of major Arts awards.

Two statisticians with the Metropolitan Life Insurance Company used inclusion in Who's Who in America in a study conducted 1950–1961, which concluded that people listed in the publication lived longer than their unlisted peers.

See also
Who's Who#Other publications and scams

References

External links
Library Journal eReview of Marquis Biographies Online, September 15, 2011
Library Journal Reference Reviews, August 2011
Who's who in America at the HathiTrust

Publishing companies established in 1898
1898 establishments in the United States
Book publishing companies based in New Jersey
Who's Who, Marquis